Thomas Maule may refer to:
Sir Thomas Maule (died 1303), captain of Brechin Castle, Scotland during the First War of Scottish Independence
Sir Thomas Maule of Panmure (died 1411), Baron of Panmure and Benvie, died at the Battle of Harlaw, 1411
Thomas Maule of Panmure (died 1450), Baron of Panmure and Benvie and claimant to Brechin
Thomas Maule (Quaker) (1645–1724), critic of the Salem Witch Trials, who was imprisoned for his public stance